The Brockville Jail is a jail in Brockville, Ontario operated by the provincial Ministry of the Solicitor General. It is the oldest operational jail in the province.

On August 27, 2020 the Government of Ontario announced funding for a new facility to replace the Brockville Jail as part of a larger project to renovate and replace prisons in eastern Ontario. The new 66-bed facility, to be called the Brockville Correctional Complex, will be constructed on the grounds of the St. Lawrence Valley Correctional and Treatment Centre.

See also 
List of correctional facilities in Ontario

References

Prisons in Ontario
Buildings and structures in Brockville
1842 establishments in Canada